Ketti railway station is a railway station of the Nilgiri Mountain Railway in Ketti, a hill station town, in the Nilgiris district of Tamil Nadu. It is a World Heritage Site and the popular Ooty passenger passes by the station. It is administered by the Salem railway division of the Southern Railway zone. The station code is:KXT.

Trains

References

Railway stations in Nilgiris district
Railway stations opened in 1908
1908 establishments in India
Mountain railways in India